Maerehia of Ra'iatea and Taha'a (1824 – 28 May 1893), was a princess of Raiatea and Tahaa from the Tamatoa dynasty family, a Polynesian royal family. She was wife of Ari'imate of Huahine, founder of the Teururai dynasty which reigned on the Tahitian island of Huahine and Maia'o during the 19th century. She was Queen of Huahine and Maia'o and later Queen regnant in her own right. Comteporary sources seems to call her Teha'apapa I instead, disregarding the ruling queen by the same name at the time Captain Cook visited the island.

Se was installed as Queen of Huahine in 1868 until her death in 1893.

Background
Born in Raiatea, princess Maerehia (Mary) was the only surviving daughter of King Tamatoa of Ra'iatea (1797–1857) and his commoner wife Mahuti of Vaiari. Thus, she belongs to the Tamatoa family, the most powerful royal family of the Society Island. She was the last member of the Tamatoa dynasty.

By her father's elder sister, Queen consort Tere-moe-moe of Tahiti, she is the only first cousin to Queen Pomare of Tahiti.

Queen consort
In the beginning of the 1850 year, a civil war deposed her father's other elder sister, Teri'itaria II. The main dignitaries chose chief Ari'imate to be king and that's why he assumed the sovereignty on 18 March 1852.

He was installed as king of Huahine in 1852. His crowning took place on March 18, 1852.

Princess Maerehia became Queen consort to her husband.

Queen regnant
Twenty year later, a new civil war deposed her husband in 1868. She succeeded him and took the reign name of Teha'apapa II.

In 1890, she accepted the French protectorate on her kingdom. She died among her family in 1893. Her granddaughter succeeded her under the name of Te-ha'apapa III.

Marriage and issue
She married in 1840 Chief Ari'imate of Té-faré-ri-i, and had twelve children:
 Princess Témari'i Teururai (1848–1891), the future queen of Huahine.
 Princess Tapiria Teururai (1850–1888)
 Crown Prince Marama Teururai (1851–1909), Head of the royal family of Huahine and father of  Queen Teha'apapa III of Huahine.
 Princess Vai-ra'a-toa Teururai, she had issue three children's.
 Prince Ari'imate Teururai (1853–1907), or Tamatoa VI, last king of Ra'iatea and Taha'a.
 Prince Téri'i-té-po-rou-ara'i Teururai (1857–1899), His family established in Tahiti.
 Prince Fatino Marae-ta'ata Teururai (1859–1884), He had issue eight children.
 Princess Tu-rai-ari'i Teururai (1862-?), she had issue two children through an irregular union.
 Princess Téri'i-na-va-ho-ro'a Teururai (1863–1918), she had eleven children.
 Princess Té-fa'a-ora Teururai (1868–1928), she had issue two daughters.

Their children remain member to the royal family of the former kingdom of Huahine-Maia'o and Ra'iatea-Taha'a since the end of the monarchy.

Ancestry

Family

See also
List of monarchs of Tahiti
French Polynesia
List of monarchs who lost their thrones in the 19th century

References

 La lignée royale des Tamatoa de Ra'iatea (îles Sous-le-Vent), Papeete, ministère de la Culture, 229 p., B.SAURA.
 Chefs et notables au temps du protectorat: 1842 - 1880'', Société des Etudes Océaniennes, Raoul TEISSIER, réédition de 1996.

External links

1824 births
1893 deaths
Huahine royalty
Queens regnant in Oceania
19th-century women rulers
People from Raiatea
19th-century monarchs in Oceania